Ippa is a genus of moths belonging to the family Tineidae.

Species
Some species are:
Sri Lanka:
Ippa polyscia  (Meyrick, 1917)
Ippa recitatella  (Walker, 1864)
Ippa taxiarcha  (Meyrick, 1916)

India:
Ippa inceptrix  (Meyrick, 1916)
Ippa lepras  (Meyrick, 1917)
Ippa megalopa  (Meyrick, 1915)
Ippa plana  (Meyrick, 1920)
Ippa sollicata  (Meyrick, 1917)
Ippa vacivella  Walker, 1864

References

Tineidae
Tineidae genera